Mercurius may refer to:

Mythology and fiction
 , a Roman god
 Mercurius, the demon from the German fairy tale "The Spirit in the Bottle"
 The OZ-13MSX2 Mercurius, a mobile suit appearing in the anime Mobile Suit Gundam Wing

People
 Saint Mercurius (224/225–250 AD), Christian saint and a martyr
 Pope John II (died 535), whose given name was Mercurius
 Mercurius Oxoniensis (1914–2003), pen-name of the British historian Hugh Trevor-Roper
 Mercurius of Transylvania, voivode of Transylvania
 Mercurius of Slavonia, ban of Slavonia

Other uses
 Mercurius (crater), a crater on the Moon
 Mercurius (trade union), a former Dutch trade union
 Mercurius (Sweden), a Swedish Investment company that part bought Coloroll

See also
 Mercury (disambiguation)
 Meconium, the earliest stool of a mammalian infant